Sacred Heart Cathedral is the cathedral of the Roman Catholic Archdiocese of Kota Kinabalu, and the seat of its current archbishop, John Wong Soo Kau. The current cathedral was built from 1979 to 1981, with its dedication held on 21 November 1981.

History
In early January 1903, Fr Henry van der Heyden first arrived in Jesselton. His aggressive policy of importing Chinese workers by the Chartered Company Government sudden flooded the town with the arrival of hundreds of Chinese immigrants. The mission was named Sacred Heart of Jesus in June 1903.

The bulk of the early Catholic community was made up of poor Hakka farmers in a completely new land striving to adjust to all the harsh conditions of a new life. Surrounded by experience of much struggles and suffering in their daily lives, Fr Heyden thought of God's compassionate love for His children in Borneo, and remembered that Jesus also suffered and died for them, which is possibly the reason the church was then named Sacred Heart.

Gallery

See also
 List of cathedrals in Malaysia

Roman Catholic cathedrals in Malaysia
Buildings and structures in Kota Kinabalu
Roman Catholic churches in Malaysia
Cathedrals in Malaysia
20th-century Roman Catholic church buildings in Malaysia